In functional analysis, the Fréchet–Kolmogorov theorem (the names of Riesz or Weil are sometimes added as well) gives a necessary and sufficient condition for a set of functions to be relatively compact in an Lp space. It can be thought of as an Lp version of the Arzelà–Ascoli theorem, from which it can be deduced.  The theorem is named after Maurice René Fréchet and Andrey Kolmogorov.

Statement 

The subset  is relatively compact if and only if the following properties hold:

The first property can be stated as  such that  with 

Usually, the Fréchet–Kolmogorov theorem is formulated with the extra assumption that  is bounded (i.e.,  uniformly on ). However, it has been shown that equitightness and equicontinuity imply this property.

Special case

However, this property must be interpreted with care as the below example shows.

Examples

Existence of solutions of a PDE
Let  be a sequence of solutions of the viscous Burgers equation posed in :

with  smooth enough. If the solutions  enjoy the -contraction and -bound properties, we will show existence of solutions of the inviscid Burgers equation

The second property simply means that .

Now, let  be any compact set, and define 

 

Automatically,  since 

We continue by considering

The first term on the right-hand side satisfies 

 

by a change of variable and the -contraction. The second term satisfies 

 
by a change of variable and the -bound. Moreover,

Both terms can be estimated as before when noticing that the time equicontinuity follows again by the -contraction.

See also
Arzelà–Ascoli theorem
Helly's selection theorem
Rellich–Kondrachov theorem

References

Literature
 
 
 

Theorems in functional analysis
Compactness theorems